The R520 road is a regional road in Ireland which links Lees Cross with Newcastle West in County Limerick.

See also 

 Roads in Ireland
 National primary road
 National secondary road

References 

Regional roads in the Republic of Ireland

Roads in County Limerick